The Sun Belt Conference (SBC) is a conference of 14 universities which participate in the National Collegiate Athletic Association's Division I. As of the upcoming 2022 season, all 14 full members play football in the conference. Although the SBC was formed in 1976, it did not sponsor football until 2001.

The conference announced that beginning in 2018, the conference (10 teams after the departure of Idaho and New Mexico State) would split into two divisions for football. In the East: Appalachian State, Coastal Carolina, Georgia Southern, Georgia State, and Troy; In the West: Arkansas State, Louisiana, Louisiana–Monroe, South Alabama, and Texas State. The winners of each division meet in the Sun Belt Championship Game. Beginning in 2022, the SBC added the Marshall Thundering Herd, James Madison Dukes, Old Dominion Monarchs, and Southern Miss Golden Eagles football programs to the conference, with the Alabama–Georgia border serving as the new dividing line for the divisions. Accordingly, the Troy Trojans moved from the East Division to the West Division, where Southern Miss joined them. Marshall, JMU, and ODU joined the East division at that time.

Membership

Current

Former

Conference facilities

Records

School records

Team vs. team
Composite all-time records

Totals through the end of the 2021 season.

Current head coaching records
Records accurate entering the 2022 season.

Reorganization

Conference champions

Pre-championship game era (2001–2017)

Sun Belt Championship Game (2018–Present)

In 2020, the Sun Belt Conference Football Championship Game was cancelled due to COVID-19 cases in the Coastal Carolina program, and as a result, CCU and Louisiana were declared co-champions.

Bowl games 
As of the 2017 season the Sun Belt Conference has 5 bowl game tie-ins.  The following two games will feature a Sun Belt team every season.  

Three of the following games will feature a Sun Belt team every year, as determined by an ESPN Events "flex model".

Rivalries

Conference play

Non-conference play

Final standings

References

External links
 

 
2001 establishments in the United States